KMVE may refer to:

 KMVE, a radio station licensed to California City, California, United States
 KCEL, a radio station licensed to Mojave, California, which used the callsign KMVE between 2006 and 2009
 Montevideo-Chippewa County Airport, Minnesota, United States